The Breitentalskopf is a hill in the Harz Mountains of central Germany, that rises southeast of Sieber in the district of Göttingen in Lower Saxony. It is 579.1 m high and separates the River Sieber from the Breitental valley (with its stream, the Tiefenbeek), that gave the hill its name. Towards the southeast is the ridge of the Aschentalshalbe.

Sources 
 Topographic map 1:25000, No. 4328 Bad Lauterberg in Harz

Hills of the Harz
Hills of Lower Saxony
Göttingen (district)